The Mangaia crake (Porzana rua) is an extinct species of flightless bird in the rail family, Rallidae.

History
The crake was described in 1986 from subfossil bones of late Holocene age found in caves on the island of Mangaia, in the southern Cook Islands of East Polynesia.  The cause of its extinction is ascribed to a combination of predation and habitat alteration following human settlement of the island and the introduction of exotic mammals.

See also
 List of birds of the Cook Islands

References

Mangaia crake
Birds of Mangaia
Extinct flightless birds
Extinct birds of Oceania
Late Quaternary prehistoric birds
Holocene extinctions
Fossil taxa described in 1986
Mangaia crake